Marc Biadacz (born 3 September 1979) is a German politician of the Christian Democratic Union (CDU) who has been serving as a member of the Bundestag from the state of Baden-Württemberg since 2017.

Political career 
Biadacz became a member of the Bundestag in the 2017 German federal election, representing the electoral district of Böblingen in Baden-Württemberg. In parliament, he is a member of the Committee on Petitions and the Committee on Labour and Social Affairs. In this capacity, he serves as his parliamentary group’s rapporteur on migrant workers.

Political positions 
Ahead of the 2021 national elections, Biadacz endorsed Markus Söder as the Christian Democrats' joint candidate to succeed Chancellor Angela Merkel.

References

External links 

  
 Bundestag biography 

1979 births
Living people
Members of the Bundestag for Baden-Württemberg
Members of the Bundestag 2021–2025
Members of the Bundestag 2017–2021
Members of the Bundestag for the Christian Democratic Union of Germany